Christopher Charles Dahlquist  (born December 14, 1962) is an American former professional ice hockey player. Dahlquist played for four National Hockey League (NHL) teams during his career.

Personal life
He played 4 seasons for Lake Superior State University in the NCAA. Dahlquist and his wife Jeanie reside in Eden Prairie, Minnesota. The couple have two children, Chad and Charly.

Playing career 
Dahlquist started his National Hockey League career with the Pittsburgh Penguins in 1985. He also played for the Minnesota North Stars and Calgary Flames. After the 1994 season he moved to the Ottawa Senators for the next 2 seasons. He played 1996–97 in the IHL with the Las Vegas Thunder before retiring from hockey.  Dahlquist played a total of 532 regular season games, scoring 19 goals and 71 assists for 90 assists, collecting 488 penalty minutes.

Career statistics

External links 
 

1962 births
American men's ice hockey defensemen
Baltimore Skipjacks players
Calgary Flames players
Cincinnati Cyclones (IHL) players
Ice hockey players from Minnesota
Lake Superior State Lakers men's ice hockey players
Las Vegas Thunder players
Living people
Minnesota North Stars players
Muskegon Lumberjacks players
Ottawa Senators players
Pittsburgh Penguins players
Undrafted National Hockey League players
People from Fridley, Minnesota